Margarita Yevgenyevna Mukasheva (née Matsko on 4 January 1986) is a Kazakhstani runner who specializes in the individual 800 metres and 4 × 400 m relay.

Mukasheva took up athletics aged 16 and has had success on the regional level. At the 2007 Asian Championships she won a bronze medal in the relay. She won the bronze medal in the individual event at the 2008 Asian Indoor Championships, silver at the 2009 Asian Championships and gold at the 2009 Asian Indoor Games. She competed at the 2010 World Indoor Championships, the 2011 and 2013 World Athletics Championships and the 2012 Summer Olympics.

After winning a gold medal at the 2014 Asian Games, Mukasheva semi-retired for a year and worked as a sports administrator. She returned to compete at the 2016 Olympics. She qualified in the 800 metres event, but was eliminated in the heats.

Competition record

References

1986 births
Living people
Kazakhstani female middle-distance runners
Kazakhstani people of Russian descent
Athletes (track and field) at the 2012 Summer Olympics
Athletes (track and field) at the 2016 Summer Olympics
Olympic athletes of Kazakhstan
Asian Games gold medalists for Kazakhstan
Asian Games silver medalists for Kazakhstan
Asian Games medalists in athletics (track and field)
Athletes (track and field) at the 2010 Asian Games
Athletes (track and field) at the 2014 Asian Games
Athletes (track and field) at the 2018 Asian Games
Universiade medalists in athletics (track and field)
Medalists at the 2010 Asian Games
Medalists at the 2014 Asian Games
Medalists at the 2018 Asian Games
Universiade gold medalists for Kazakhstan
Competitors at the 2007 Summer Universiade
Competitors at the 2011 Summer Universiade
Medalists at the 2013 Summer Universiade